Mexican Spitfire Sees a Ghost is a 1942 American comedy film directed by Leslie Goodwins and written by Charles E. Roberts and Monte Brice. It is the sequel to the 1942 film Mexican Spitfire at Sea. The film stars Lupe Vélez, Leon Errol, Charles "Buddy" Rogers, Elisabeth Risdon, Donald MacBride and Minna Gombell. The film was released on June 26, 1942, by RKO Pictures.

It is notorious as the film representing the top half of a double bill, in which the film at the bottom of the bill was Orson Welles' now-classic second feature film The Magnificent Ambersons, also produced by RKO Pictures.

Plot

Cast 
 Lupe Vélez as Carmelita Lindsay
 Leon Errol as Uncle Matt Lindsay / Lord Basil Epping
 Charles "Buddy" Rogers as Dennis Lindsay
 Elisabeth Risdon as Aunt Della Lindsay
 Donald MacBride as Percy Fitzbadden
 Minna Gombell as Edith Fitzbadden
 Don Barclay as Fingers O'Toole
 John McGuire as Luders
 Lillian Randolph as Hyacinth
 Mantan Moreland as Lightnin'
 Harry Tyler as Bascombe
 Marten Lamont as Mr. Harcourt

References

External links 
 
 
 
 

1942 films
American black-and-white films
RKO Pictures films
Films directed by Leslie Goodwins
1942 comedy films
American comedy films
Films produced by Cliff Reid
1940s English-language films
1940s American films